The 2010–11 Elite Women's Hockey League season was the seventh season of the Elite Women's Hockey League, a multi-national women's ice hockey league. The EHV Sabres of Austria won the league title for the second time.

Regular season

Playoffs

Semifinals
EHV Sabres - MHK Martin 9:1
HC Slovan Bratislava - ESC Planegg/Würmtal 4:1

Final
EHV Sabres - HC Slovan Bratislava 2:1

3rd place
ESC Planegg/Würmtal - MHK Martin 9:0

External links
Season on hockeyarchives.info

Women
European Women's Hockey League seasons
Euro